Brede is a neighbourhood (Danish: bydel, a named neighbourhood) 14 km north of Copenhagen, Denmark. It is located east of Virum, south of Ørholm, west of Lundtofte and north of Sorgenfri. Frilandsmuseet (The Open Air Museum), and The National Museum of Denmark's new museum, Brede Works, is located in Brede. Nærumbanen stops in Brede.

Notable people 
Ferdinand Richardt (born in Brede; 1819–1895), artist and lithographer
Bille August (born 1948 in Brede), director, screenwriter, and cinematographer

References 

Cities and towns in the Capital Region of Denmark
Copenhagen metropolitan area
Neighbourhoods in Denmark
Lyngby-Taarbæk Municipality